The field of wound ballistics largely comprises the study of the physical and physiological effects of ballistic trauma by projectiles (primarily, but not exclusively, bullets) on living humans or animals.  It can be considered the interdisciplinary intersection of trauma medicine and terminal ballistics.

See also
Bullet hit squibs
Gunshot injury
Hydrostatic shock
Penetrating trauma
Sniper
Stopping power

Ballistics

pl:Rana postrzałowa